Peter Sturgeon (born February 12, 1954) is a Canadian retired professional ice hockey player. He was drafted by the Boston Bruins with the 36th overall pick in the 1974 NHL Entry Draft. He went on to play in six games in the National Hockey League, all with the Colorado Rockies.

He is the father of musician Adam Sturgeon of Status/Non-Status and OMBIIGIZI.

Career statistics

Regular season and playoffs

References

External links

Hockey Draft Central

1954 births
Living people
Baltimore Clippers players
Boston Bruins draft picks
Broome Dusters players
Canadian ice hockey left wingers
Colorado Rockies (NHL) players
Columbus Owls players
Fort Worth Texans players
Grand Rapids Owls players
Ice hockey people from Yukon
Kitchener Rangers players
New England Whalers draft picks
Phoenix Roadrunners (PHL) players
Rochester Americans players
Sportspeople from Whitehorse